Filmer  may refer to:
Filmer baronets
Caileigh Filmer (born 1996), Canadian rower
Dennis Filmer (1916–1981), Malaysian Olympic sport shooter
Edmund Filmer (disambiguation), several people
Edward Filmer (c. 1654 – 1703), English dramatist
Henry Filmer (died 1543), English Protestant martyr
John Filmer (disambiguation), several people
Mary Georgina Filmer (née Cecil; 1838–1903), British photographic collage artist
Robert Filmer (disambiguation), several people
Walter Drowley Filmer (1865–1944), an early pioneer of X-rays in Australia

Filmer Honywood
Filmer Hubble (1904–1969), Canadian organist, choir conductor, adjudicator, and music educator
Filmer S. Northrop